Niphargus tatrensis is a troglobitic species of crustacean in the family Niphargidae, living in the karst waters of Austria, the Czech Republic, Hungary, Poland, and Slovakia. It can be found in caves, and also in karst springs and in wells in the karstic areas.

Niphargus tatrensis was discovered in 1887 by August Wrześniowski in a well in Zakopane and described by him in 1888. The specific epithet comes from the Tatra Mountains.

Subspecies 
 Niphargus tatrensis aggtelekiensis Dudich
 Niphargus tatrensis hrabei S. Karaman
 Niphargus tatrensis lunzensis Schellenberg
 Niphargus tatrensis lurensis Schellenberg
 Niphargus tatrensis reyersdorfensis Schellenberg
 Niphargus tatrensis salzburgensis Schellenberg
 Niphargus tatrensis schneebergensis Schellenberg
 Niphargus tatrensis tatrensis Wrześniowski

References

External links

Niphargidae
Cave crustaceans
Crustaceans described in 1888
Freshwater crustaceans of Europe